Lantarón (Basque: Landaran) is a town and municipality located in the province of Álava, in the Basque Country, northern Spain.

Villages 

 Alcedo(Altzeta)
 Bergüenda(Bergoiandia)
 Caicedo de Yuso(Kaitzeo)
 Comunión 
 Fontecha (Ontetxa)
 Leciñana del Camino (Leziñana)
 Molinilla
 Puentelarrá (Larrazubi)
 Salcedo (Saltzeta)
 Sobrón (Sobaran)
 Turiso (Iturritzo)
 Zubillaga

History
In the Middle Ages, Lantarón was the site of a fortress on the eastern edge of the Kingdom of León. In the ninth and tenth centuries the fortress was commanded by a series of counts, often in conjunction with that of Cerezo: Gonzalo Téllez (897), Munio Vélaz (919), Fernando Díaz (923) and Álvaro Herraméliz (929).

References

External links
 LANTARÓN in the Bernardo Estornés Lasa - Auñamendi Encyclopedia 

Municipalities in Álava